Middleton Township is an inactive township in Lafayette County, in the U.S. state of Missouri.

Middleton Township was established in 1848, taking its name from the community of "Middleton", now known as Waverly.

References

Townships in Missouri
Townships in Lafayette County, Missouri